Boldu is a commune in Buzău County, Muntenia, Romania. It is composed of a single village, also called Boldu.

Notes

Communes in Buzău County
Localities in Muntenia